Lihim ng Lumang Simbahan is a 1940 Filipino film directed by Tor Villano. It stars Tita Duran, Reynaldo Dante and Luningning.

External links
 

1940 films
Filipino-language films
Tagalog-language films
Philippine black-and-white films